

Karl Hermann Arndt (10 March 1892  – 30 December 1981) was a German general in the Wehrmacht during World War II who commanded several divisions.  He was a recipient of the Knight's Cross of the Iron Cross with Oak Leaves of Nazi Germany.

Awards and decorations
 Iron Cross (1914) 2nd Class (3 October 1914) 1st Class (26 January 1918)
 Honour Cross of the World War 1914/1918 (31 December 1934)
 Wehrmacht Long Service Award 1st Class (2 October 1936)
 Iron Cross (1939) 2nd Class (27 October 1939) & 1st Class  (17 June 1940)
 German Cross in Gold on 2 July 1944 as Generalleutnant in the 359. Infanterie-Division
 Knight's Cross of the Iron Cross with Oak Leaves
 Knight's Cross on 23 January 1942 as Oberst and commander of Infanterie-Regiment 511
 Oak Leaves on 1 February 1945 as Generalleutnant and commander of 359. Infanterie-Division

References

Citations

Bibliography

 
 
 
 

1892 births
1981 deaths
People from Głogów
People from the Province of Silesia
Lieutenant generals of the German Army (Wehrmacht)
German Army personnel of World War I
Prussian Army personnel
Recipients of the clasp to the Iron Cross, 1st class
Recipients of the Gold German Cross
Recipients of the Knight's Cross of the Iron Cross with Oak Leaves
German prisoners of war in World War II held by the United States
World War I prisoners of war held by the United Kingdom
Reichswehr personnel
20th-century Freikorps personnel
German Army generals of World War II